Krnice is a settlement in the Municipality of Hrastnik in central Slovenia. It lies in the hills above the left bank of the Sava River. The area is part of the traditional region of Styria. It is now included with the rest of the municipality in the Central Sava Statistical Region.

References

External links
Krnice on Geopedia

Populated places in the Municipality of Hrastnik